M2M may refer to:

Entertainment
 Mission to Mars (attraction) at Walt Disney World's Magic Kingdom, Florida USA
 Mission to Mars (2000), a  science fiction film inspired by the attraction
 M2M (band), Norwegian pop duo

Technology
 M2M (Eclipse), an implementation of the Object Management Group's QVT standard for model transformation
 Machine to machine, direct communication between devices
 Many-to-many (data model), as an entity-relationship model
 Mobile-to-mobile convergence
 Mobile-to-mobile, a classification of phone call on some mobile phone plans

Other uses
 Man-to-man defense, a defensive tactic used in a variety of sports
 mothers2mothers, an international nonprofit organization dedicated to preventing mother-to-child transmission of HIV

See also
 MTM (disambiguation)

ja:M2M